John Tuttle may refer to:
 John Tuttle (organist), Canadian-American organist and choral conductor
 John Tuttle (athlete), American long-distance runner
 John Tuttle (politician) (1951/1952–2022), American politician from Maine